Davidson Ishmael is a Barbadian politician. He is a member of parliament in the House of Assembly of Barbados. He was first elected member of parliament in January 2018. He also serves as the Minister of Industry, Innovation, Science and Technology in the cabinet of Mia Mottley.

References 

Living people
Barbadian politicians
Government ministers of Barbados
Barbados Labour Party politicians
Year of birth missing (living people)